304 Squadron may refer to:

304th Tactical Fighter Squadron (JASDF), Japan
No. 304 Polish Bomber Squadron
304 Squadron (Portugal)
304th Expeditionary Airlift Squadron, United States
304th Rescue Squadron, United States
304th Transport Squadron, later 304th Special Operations Squadron, United States